Pamela El Kik (Arabic: باميلا الكيك ; born 14 May 1988 in Deir al-Qamar) is a Lebanese actress who grew up in Ashrafieh, Lebanon. She began her career at an early age. She won the Murex d'or three times; her most famous wins were for Alhob Almamnou’ in 2010, Duo Al Gharam in 2012 And Samra in 2016.

Early life and career 
El Kik was born in Deir al-Qamar, south-east of Beirut to Hani El Kik and his wife Taghreed. Her first appearances were long sketches shot with Wassim Tabbarah, at the age of 15. Tabbarah encouraged her to be follow a career in art; the young Pamela wanted since to be a professional actress.

El Kik started her early formal career at the age of 18 while studying communication arts specialized in cinema at The Holy Spirit University of Kaslik (USEK). She participated in some local works: Erbit Tenhall (2005), Imraa Min Dayaa (2005) Madame Bambino (2006) and Sara (2009).

Awards 

 Murex d’or Award for Best Supporting Actress for her performance in “Samra” 2016.
 Murex d’or Award for Best Supporting Actress for her performance in “The Forbidden Love” 2010.
 Murex d’or Award for Best Supporting Actress for her performance in "Due El Gharam" 2012.

Works

Series

Films

TV Shows 

 She participated in Celebrity Duets first season on LBCI in (2011), where she sang with many artists including: Assi El-Hallani, Kathem El-Saher, Marwan Khoury, Moein Shreif and other big names.
 Casino Du Liban also collaborated with Pamela when she guest starred
 Broadway Show that was hosted there over 3 successful nights.

Books 

 In 2014, Pamela revealed her mindset through a book, Pam est là - No’ta (نقطة), which was launched during the Arabic Book Fair in -Biel- Beirut.
 The book is a social, artistic and political handwritten quotes diary.

Other works 
El Kik joined George Khabbaz in a play called Aal Tarik.

References 

1988 births
Living people
Members of Syndicate of Professional Artists in Lebanon
Lebanese Christians
Lebanese film actresses